Jeb is a masculine given name or nickname. It can be derived from the initials "J. E. B.", or from "Jebediah". It may refer to:

People

Given name
Jeb Bardon (born 1973), American politician
Jeb Bishop (born 1962), American musician
Jeb Corliss (born 1976), American BASE jumper
Jeb Flesch (born 1969), American football player
Jeb Hensarling (born 1957), American politician
Jeb Huckeba (born 1982), American football player
Jeb Livingood, American essayist, short story writer, editor, and academic
Jeb Loy Nichols, American musician
Jebediah Jeb Putzier (born 1979), American National Football League player
Jeb Sharp, American radio journalist
Jeb Stuart Magruder (1934-2014), American businessman and civil servant convicted of conspiracy in the Watergate affair
Jeb Stuart (writer) (born 1956), American film director, producer and screenwriter
Jeb Terry (born 1981), American football player

Nickname
John Jeb Blount (born 1954), American National Football League quarterback
Joseph Jeb Bradley (born 1952), American politician
John Jeb Brovsky (born 1988), American soccer player
J. E. B. Seely, 1st Baron Mottistone (1868–1947), British soldier and politician
John Jeb Burton (born 1992), American racing driver
John Ellis "Jeb" Bush (born 1953), American politician, former governor of Florida
George Jeb Spaulding (born 1952), American politician
J. E. B. Stuart (1833–1864), American (Confederate) general
Jens "Jeb" Bergensten (born 1979), Swedish video game designer

Fictional characters
Jeb, in the television series VR Troopers
Jeb Cain, in the television series Tin Man
Jeb Batchelder, in the Maximum Ride novels of James Patterson
Jebediah Guthrie, a Marvel Comics mutant
Jebediah Springfield, the founder of Springfield from the television series "The Simpsons"
 Jeb McKettrick, in the novel Secondhand Bride by Linda Lael Miller

See also
Jed (disambiguation)

English masculine given names
Masculine given names
Lists of people by nickname